Bibliography of British science fiction and fantasy writer Tanith Lee:

Series

Birthgrave series
 The Birthgrave (1975)
 Shadowfire (1978) (US title: Vazkor, Son of Vazkor)
 Quest for the White Witch (1978) (2016 ed. titled: Hunting the White Witch)

Blood Opera sequence
 Dark Dance (1992)
 Personal Darkness (1993)
 Darkness, I (1994)

Claidi Journals
 Law of the Wolf Tower (1998) (US title: Wolf Tower)
 Wolf Star Rise (2000) (US title: Wolf Star)
 Queen of the Wolves (2001) (US title: Wolf Queen)
 Wolf Wing (2002)
 The Claidi Journals (2002) (omnibus of the first three novels)

Colouring Book
 L'Amber (2006)
 Greyglass (2011)
 To Indigo (2011)
 Killing Violets (2012)
 Ivoria (2012)
 Cruel Pink (2013)
 Turquoiselle (2014)

Four-BEE series (Don't Bite the Sun)
 Don't Bite the Sun (1976)
 Drinking Sapphire Wine (1977)
 Drinking Sapphire Wine (1979), reissued as Biting the Sun (1999) (omnibus of both novels)

Ghosteria
 Ghosteria Volume One: The Stories (2014)
 Ghosteria Volume Two: Zircons May Be Mistaken (2014)

The Lionwolf Series
 Cast a Bright Shadow (2004)
 Here In Cold Hell (2005)
 No Flame but Mine (2007)

Marcheval
 A Different City (2015)
 Idoll (2015)
 Not Stopping at Heaven (2015)
 The Portrait in Gray (2015)

The Piratica Series
 Piratica: Being a Daring Tale of a Singular Girl's Adventures Upon the High Seas (2004)
 Piratica II: Return to Parrot Island (2006)
 Piratica III: The Family Sea (2007)

Sabella
 Sabella, or the Blood Stone (1980)
 Kill the Dead (1980)
 Sometimes, After Sunset (1980) (omnibus of both novels)

Secret Books of Paradys 
set in an alternate version of Paris
 The Book of the Damned (1988)
 The Book of the Beast (1988)
 The Book of the Dead (1991) (collection of short stories set in this world)
 The Book of the Mad (1993)
 The Book of the Damned & The Book of the Beast (1988) (omnibus)
 "The Nightmare's Tale" (1990) 
 The Secret Books of Paradys 1 & 2 (1991) (omnibus)
 The Secret Books of Paradys 3 & 4 (1993) (omnibus)
 The Secret Books of Paradys (2006) (omnibus reprint of all four books)

Secret Books of Venus
set in an alternate version of Venice
 Faces Under Water (1998)
 Saint Fire (1999)
 A Bed of Earth (2002)
 Venus Preserved (2003)
 The Secret Books of Venus I & II (1999) (omnibus)
 The Secret Books of Venus III & IV (2003) (omnibus)

S.I.L.V.E.R. series
 The Silver Metal Lover (1981)
 Metallic Love (2005)
 The Tin Man (TBD)

Tales from the Flat Earth

 Night's Master (1978) (illustrated by George Barr, and Alicia Austin in 1985)
 Death's Master (1979)
 Delusion's Master (1981)
 Delirium's Mistress (1986)
 Night's Sorceries (1986) (collection of novellas set in this world)
 Tales from the Flat Earth: The Lords of Darkness (1987) (omnibus of first three novels)
 Tales from the Flat Earth: Night's Daughter (1987) (omnibus of fourth and fifth books)
 I Bring You Forever (1998)
 The Man Who Stole the Moon (2001)
 Our Lady of Scarlet (2009)

The Unicorn Series
 Black Unicorn (1991)
 Gold Unicorn (1994)
 Red Unicorn (1997)

Voyage of the Basset
Based on setting of Voyage of the Basset
 Islands in the Sky (1999)

Wars of Vis
 The Storm Lord (1976)
 Anackire (1983)
 The Wars of Vis (1984) (omnibus)
 The White Serpent (1988)

Other novels
 The Dragon Hoard (1971) (standalone MagicQuest book)
 East of Midnight (1977) (standalone MagicQuest book)
 Volkhavaar (1977)
 The Castle of Dark (1978)
 Shon the Taken (1979)
 Electric Forest (1979)
 Day by Night (1980)
 Lycanthia, or The Children of Wolves (1981)
 Prince on a White Horse (1982)
 Sung in Shadow (1983) (fantasy retelling of Romeo and Juliet)
 Days of Grass (1985)
 A Heroine of the World (1989) (Illustrated by Anne Yvonne Gilbert)
 The Blood of Roses (1990)
 Heart-Beast (1992)
 Elephantasm (1993)
 Eva Fairdeath (1994)
 Vivia (1995)
 Reigning Cats and Dogs (1995)
 When the Lights Go Out (1996)
 The Gods Are Thirsty (1996) (historical novel about the French Revolution)
 White As Snow (2000) (a retelling of the fairy tale Snow White)
 Mortal Suns (2003)
 Death of the Day (2004)
 34 (2004) (as Esther Garber)
 Indigara (2007)

Collections
 Princess Hynchatti & Some Other Surprises (1972) (collection of original fairy tales)
 Unsilent Night (1981)
 Cyrion (1982) (collection of short stories framed by a novella, all centred on the title character)
 Red as Blood, or Tales from the Sisters Grimmer (1983) (collection of fantasy retellings of fairy tales)
 Tamastara, or The Indian Nights (1984) (collection of stories and novellas themed around India)
 The Gorgon and Other Beastly Tales (1985) (collection of various short stories)
 Dreams of Dark and Light: The Great Short Fiction of Tanith Lee (1986) (collection of various short stories)
 Dark Castle, White Horse (1986) (omnibus of the two unrelated novels The Castle of Dark and Prince on a White Horse)
 Forests of The Night (1989) (collection)
 Women as Demons: The Male Perception of Women through Space and Time (1989) (collection of various short stories)
 Nightshades: Thirteen Journeys Into Shadow (1993) (collection of short stories and a novella)
 Fatal Women (2004) (as Esther Garber)
 Tempting The Gods: The Selected Stories of Tanith Lee, Volume One (2009)
 Hunting The Shadows: The Selected Stories of Tanith Lee, Volume Two (2009)
 Sounds and Furies: Seven Faces of Darkness (2010)
 Disturbed By Her Song (2010)
 Cold Grey Stones (2012)
 Animate Objects (2013)
 Space is Just a Starry Night (2013) short story collection, Aqueduct Press, Seattle
 Colder Greyer Stones (2013)
 Phantasya (2014)
 Dancing Through The Fire (2015)
 Blood 20: Tales of Vampire Horror (2015)
 Legenda Maris (2015)
 Redder Than Blood (2017)
 The Weird Tales of Tanith Lee (2017)
 Tanith by Choice: The Best of Tanith Lee (2017)
 Venus Burning: Realms (2018)
 Tanith Lee A-Z (2018)
 Strindberg's Ghost Sonata and Other Uncollected Tales (2019)
 Love in a Time of Dragons & Other Rare Tales (2019)
 A Wolf at the Door and Other Rare Tales (2019)
 The Heart of the Moon (2019)
 The Empress of Dreams (2021)
 The Earth is Flat: Tales from the Flat Earth and Elsewhere (forthcoming, 2023)

Chapbooks
The Betrothed (1968)
 Animal Castle (1972)
 Companions on the Road (1975)
 The Winter Players (1976)
 Companions on the Road and The Winter Players: Two Novellas (1977) (omnibus)
 The Beautiful Biting Machine (1984)
 Madame Two Swords (1988)
 Into Gold (1991)
 Louisa the Poisoner (1996)

Short fiction
 The Thaw (1979)
 
 
 "Persian Eyes" (2002) (appeared in both the DAW 30th Anniversary: Fantasy and Year's Best Fantasy 3 anthologies)

References

 
Bibliographies by writer
Bibliographies of British writers
Fantasy bibliographies
Horror fiction bibliographies
Science fiction bibliographies